Loeu may refer to:

Khmer Loeu, the collective name given to the indigenous ethnic groups in the highlands of Cambodia
Lynx OEU, an independent unit within the British Royal Navy's Lynx Helicopter Force

See also
Loyew, a town in the province of Homiel, Belarus